Adagio City Aparthotel is a joint venture launched by Accor and Pierre & Vacances, and is a major hotel company offering rooms with cooking facilities.

History
Adagio City Aparthotel is a joint venture launched by AccorHotels and Pierre & Vacances in October 2007. It manages residences and Hotel to rent in tourist cities. The city residences correspond to business travelers on a long term assignment but also French or foreign families on vacation, who can use their kitchens in these apartments and avoid restaurant expenses. Urban tourism has a much higher growth rate than the overall average growth rate of tourism in France in terms of overnight stays, according to specialists.

In 2011, Adagio complemented its offerings with the acquisition of Citéa becoming Adagio Access. The Adagio network is composed of offers for Adagio (the standard package) and Adagio Access (economy offer). Adagio has 90 locations, mostly in Europe (France, Belgium, Switzerland, Germany and UK). The group is now established in Russia, the Middle East and Brazil.

As of 2015 there are 50 Adagio locations in 11 countries (mostly in Europe, as well as in Russia, UAE, Qatar, and Brazil). As of 2015 there are 46 Adagio Access locations in three countries (France, Belgium, and Germany).

References

External links

Adagio City English website

Accor
Hotels established in 2007
2007 establishments in France
Holiday villages